Emma Goldman: A Documentary History of the American Years is a collection  of original documents pertaining to anarchist Emma Goldman's time spent in the United States. Prepared by Candace Falk, founding director of the Emma Goldman Research Project at the University of California, Berkeley, the documents cover Goldman's career from her 1890 arrival in the United States through her 1919 deportation to Russia.

References

External links 

 
 Publisher's website: Vol. 1, vol. 2, vol. 3
 

Book series introduced in 2003
Books about anarchism
University of California Press books
University of Illinois Press books
Stanford University Press books
English-language books
Works about Emma Goldman